Jahodná is a village and municipality in the Dunajská Streda District in the Trnava Region of south-west Slovakia.

Geography
The bigger part of the village lies on the left bank of the small-Danube, but there is also neighborhood on the right bank. The outer rural area on the right bank of the river comprises the following parts: Zsivaj, Huszamér, Kotrási-földek, Akói-gyep, Biffar-kertek, Albert, Völgy-zátony. The left bank rural area is composed of Jártvány, Kertalja, Duna-kert, Arany-ülő, Banga-szer, Öreg-földek, Süveges, Értő, Újmajor, Szügyi-hajlás.

History
In the 9th century, the territory of Jahodná became part of the Kingdom of Hungary. In historical records the village was first mentioned in 1539. In historical records the village was first mentioned in 1539. In 1775, its name was recorded as Eperyes, later Pozsonyeperjes. In 1920, its Slovak name became Bratislavský Eperjes, after 1948, the Slovak name has been Jahodná, the Slovak authorities use Eperjes as its Hungarian name. The formal Hungarian usage is Pozsonyeperjes to disambiguate between Prešov, Eperjes in Hungarian, and this village.

Until the end of World War I, the village was part of Hungary and fell within the Dunaszerdahely district of Pozsony County. After the Austro-Hungarian army disintegrated in November 1918, Czechoslovakian troops occupied the area. After the Treaty of Trianon of 1920, the village became officially part of Czechoslovakia. In November 1938, the First Vienna Award granted the area to Hungary and it was held by Hungary until 1945. After Soviet occupation in 1945, Czechoslovakian administration returned and the village became officially part of Czechoslovakia in 1947.

Demography 
At the 2001 Census the recorded population of the village was 1374 while an end-2008 estimate by the Statistical Office had the villages's population as 1545. As of 2001, 94,03 per cent of its population was Hungarian, while 4,66 per cent was Slovak.

Roman Catholicism is the majority religion of the village, its adherents numbering 92.86% of the total population.

See also
 List of municipalities and towns in Slovakia

References

Genealogical resources

The records for genealogical research are available at the state archive "Statny Archiv in Bratislava, Slovakia"
 Roman Catholic church records (births/marriages/deaths): 1732-1895 (parish A)
 Lutheran church records (births/marriages/deaths): 1823-1946 (parish B)

External links

Microregion website 
Local Hungarian primary school website 
Surnames of living people in Jahodna

Villages and municipalities in Dunajská Streda District
Hungarian communities in Slovakia